Katalin Mária Lukácsi (born 2 October 1987) is a Hungarian politician, historian, catechist, community organizer and researcher. She has been a member of the presidium of the Everybody's Hungary Movement since 2018. Between 2011 and 2017, she was a member of the Christian Democratic People's Party. She also supported Fidesz from 2010 to 2017.

References

External links
 Her profile at the Kőrösi Program
 Her profile at Hungarian Doctoral Council

1987 births
Living people
People from Jászberény
Hungarian politicians
Eötvös Loránd University alumni
Christian Democratic People's Party (Hungary) politicians